This is a set of lists of English personal and place names having spellings that are counterintuitive to their pronunciation because the spelling does not accord with conventional pronunciation associations, or because a better known namesake with the same spelling has a markedly different pronunciation. The latter types are known as heterophonic names or heterophones (unlike heterographs, which are written differently but pronounced the same).

Excluded are the numerous spellings which fail to make the pronunciation obvious without actually being at odds with convention: for example, the pronunciation  of Schenectady is not immediately obvious, but neither is it counterintuitive.

See Help:IPA/English for guides to the IPA symbols used, and variations depending on dialect.

Place names
Boldened names indicate place names where only one part is pronounced irregularly, italicized pronunciations are uncommon. Exonyms are listed among examples.

General rules

Specific places 
This list does not include place names in the United Kingdom or the United States, or places following spelling conventions of non-English languages. For UK place names, see List of irregularly spelled places in the United Kingdom. For US place names, see List of irregularly spelled places in the United States.

This list includes territories of the United Kingdom and the United States not wholly annexed into either country.

Personal names 
Bold names are common; so while not intuitive, are among the most well-used. Names in italics are common are names of non-English origin common among English speakers and only irregular in English pronunciation.

Given names

Specific people

General use

Family names

Specific people

General use

See also 
 List of irregularly spelt places in the United Kingdom

Notes

References

Further reading
 
 

Lists of names
Lists of place names